San Pedro is one of the 38 municipalities of Coahuila, in north-eastern Mexico. The municipal seat lies at San Pedro. The municipality covers an area of 9942.4 km².

As of 2005, the municipality had a total population of 93,677.

References

Municipalities of Coahuila